André Foucher can refer to:

 André Foucher (cyclist)
 André Foucher (pentathlete)